Bromeliaglyphus is a genus of mites in the family Acaridae.

Species
 Bromeliaglyphus monteverdensis H.H.J. Nesbitt, 1985

References

Acaridae